The Ayat (Russian and , Ayat; : Aıat) is a river in Chelyabinsk Oblast, Russia and Kostanay Region, Kazakhstan. Ayat is formed by the confluence of Karataly-Ayat and Archagly-Ayat. The river flows into the Karatomar reservoir, which is drained by the river Tobol. The length of the river is 117 km, with a catchment area of 13,300 km².

Hydrology 
Much of the basin is formed by 383 drainless lakes (total area 208 km².). Russian part of the river has a length of 23 km and a watershed area of 8571 km².

The soils of the basin are mostly sandy and loam, occasionally salt. Laboissiere alluvial channels the channel is located in a well defined river valley.

In winter, the river often freezes to the bottom. Freezing was observed 5 times in past 43 years.

In art 
 "Tobol and Ayat" — a poem by Yevtushenko.

References 

 Water resources of the Chelyabinsk region

Rivers of Kazakhstan
Rivers of Chelyabinsk Oblast